Katherina Reiche (born 16 July 1973 in Luckenwalde, Bezirk Potsdam) is a German manager and former politician of the Christian Democratic Union (CDU).

Education
After receiving her Abitur in 1992, she studied chemistry at the University of Potsdam, Clarkson University in New York and the University of Turku in Finland. In 1997 she received her Diploma.

Political career
In 1992 Reiche was one of the founding members of the Ring Christlich-Demokratischer Studenten (Association of Christian-Democrat Students, RCDS) in Potsdam and in the same year she joined the Junge Union. Since 1996 she has also been member of the CDU. In 2000 Reiche became a member of the federal executive of the CDU and she also is part of the party's executive board in the state of Brandenburg.

During the election campaign in 2002, Reiche was conscripted into the CDU/CSU's competence team by then chancellor candidate Edmund Stoiber, as an expert on women, youth and family policies. This decision was criticized by conservative circles inside the two parties, because Reiche was an unmarried mother at that point in time.

From 2005 until 2009, Reiche served as deputy chairwoman of the CDU/CSU's parliamentary group, under the leadership of chairman Volker Kauder. In this capacity, she was in charge of overseeing the policy areas Education and Science as well as Environment, Nature Conservation and Nuclear Safety.

In the negotiations to form a coalition government following the 2009 federal elections, Reiche was part of the working group on the environment, agriculture and consumer protection, led by Ilse Aigner and Michael Kauch.

In the government of Chancellor Angela Merkel, Reiche first served as Parliamentary State Secretary at the Federal Ministry for the Environment, Nature Conservation and Nuclear Safety under successive ministers Norbert Röttgen (2009-2012) and Peter Altmaier (2012-2013) from 2009 to 2013. Following the 2013 elections, she was named Parliamentary State Secretary at the Federal Ministry of Transport and Digital Infrastructure, this time under the leadership of minister Alexander Dobrindt.

On the occasion of the sixtieth anniversary of the diplomatic relations between German and India, Reiche participated in the first joint cabinet meeting of the two countries' governments in Delhi in May 2011.

Life after politics
In 2015, Reiche resigned from her government office and laid down her parliamentary mandate to become Chief Executive Officer of the German Association of Local Utilities (VKU). In this capacity, she was unanimously elected President of the European Centre of Enterprises with Public Participation and of Enterprises of General Economic Interest (CEEP) in June 2016.

From 2018 until 2019, Reiche also served on the German government's so-called coal commission, which was tasked to develop a masterplan before the end of the year on how to phase-out coal and create a new economic perspective for the country's coal-mining regions.

In late 2019, Reiche moved to a new position at German energy company E.ON, where she has been leading its subsidiary Westenergie since 2020.

Other activities

Corporate boards
 Schaeffler Group, Member of the Supervisory Board (since 2023)
 Vodafone Germany, Member of the Advisory Board on Sustainability (since 2020)

Non-profit orgnizations
 German Council for Sustainable Development (RNE), Member (2016–2022, appointed ad personam by Chancellor Angela Merkel)
 Deutsche Flugsicherung (DFS), Member of the Advisory Board
 Deutsches Museum, Member of the Board of Trustees
 Konrad Adenauer Foundation (KAS), Member
 Association of German Foundations, Member of the Parliamentary Advisory Board (until 2015)

Controversy
In 2005 Reiche described the opponents of genetic engineering as "Bioterroristen" ("Bioterrorists"). She also criticized the two then government parties SPD and the Greens for trying to catch votes with this subject and stirring up the people's fears for the future.

In 2012, Reiche claimed same-sex marriage was a bigger threat to Germany than the Eurozone crisis. She was heavily criticized by LGBT groups for the remark.

References

External links
Official Website

1973 births
Living people
People from Luckenwalde
People from Bezirk Potsdam
German Lutherans
Members of the Bundestag for Brandenburg
Female members of the Bundestag
21st-century German women politicians
University of Potsdam alumni
Members of the Bundestag 2013–2017
Members of the Bundestag 2009–2013
Members of the Bundestag 2005–2009
Members of the Bundestag 2002–2005
Members of the Bundestag 1998–2002
Members of the Bundestag for the Christian Democratic Union of Germany
20th-century German women